Vesna – Green Party (Vesna) is a Slovenian green political party, founded on 9 February 2022. At the founding congress, it presented the program and 4 program pillars: environment, democracy, social justice and creativity.

The party began to appear in opinion polls since December 2021.

Electoral results

National Assembly

Presidential

References 

Political parties established in 2022
Pro-European political parties in Slovenia
Green parties in Europe
Green political parties in Slovenia